Iconoclast is the eighth studio album by the progressive metal band Symphony X, released in June 2011.

Theme
When interviewed, vocalist Russell Allen said that the lyrical concept of the album is based on "The idea of machines taking over everything, and all this technology we put our society into pretty much being our demise." Allen said on Heavy Metal Thunder that "it isn't a story, but rather a theme, like Dark Side of the Moon by Pink Floyd."

Album art
Illustrator and film concept artist Warren Flanagan (Watchmen, The Incredible Hulk, 2012), who designed the cover of Paradise Lost, returned as art director for Iconoclast. Sharing his creative process on the album's artwork: "The idea was to create imagery that was a little darker in tone to previous Symphony X albums and to represent the overall theme of Iconoclast into the artwork. The whole concept came from Michael Romeo, who had a strong idea of what the cover should represent based on the music. I just ran with it. When the album's title was decided on, I focused the image based on the meaning of it. I also wanted to use the band's signature 'masks' but present them in a way that connected to the new album."

Reception

Iconoclast debuted at number 76 on the Billboard 200 album chart in the United States, selling more than 7,300 copies in its first week. The record also debuted at number 7 on the Top Hard Rock Chart, number 19 on the Top Rock Chart and number 13 on the Top Independent Chart. The album showcases the highest chart position and the most first-week sales in the band's history.

Track listing
Iconoclast was released in two editions: a single disc version, and a double-CD special edition hardcover digipak. Guitarist Michael Romeo has stated that the special edition contains the track order that the band originally intended to release, but their label (Nuclear Blast) wanted a single-disc version as well. According to Romeo, the track "Reign in Madness" is the proper closing to the album.

Regular edition

Special edition

Disc one

Disc two

Personnel
 Russell Allen – vocals
 Michael Romeo – guitar
 Michael Pinnella – keyboards
 Michael LePond – bass
 Jason Rullo – drums
Technical personnel
 Michael Romeo – production, recording and engineering
 Jens Bogren – mixing and mastering
 Warren Flanagan – artwork

Notes

2011 albums
Concept albums
Symphony X albums
Nuclear Blast albums